Chaetogastra ciliaris is a species of flowering plant in the family Melastomataceae, native to Colombia, Costa Rica and Ecuador. It was first described as Meriania ciliaris by Étienne Ventenat in 1807. Its synonyms include Tibouchina ciliaris.

References

ciliaris
Flora of Colombia
Flora of Costa Rica
Flora of Ecuador
Plants described in 1807